Mass No. 4 may refer to:

 Mass No. 4 (Mozart), Dominicus in C major, by Wolfgang Amadeus Mozart
 Mass No. 4 (Schubert), in C major, by Franz Schubert